Prostitution in Turkey is legal and regulated. The secularization of Turkish society allowed prostitution to achieve legal status during the early 20th century. Known as "general houses" (genelevler) in the country, brothels must receive permits from the government to operate. In turn, the regulatory agencies issue identity cards to sex workers that give them rights to some free medical care and other social services. However, many local governments now have a policy of not issuing new registrations, and in some cities, such as Ankara and Bursa, brothels have been demolished by court order.

By the early 1900s, the approximated number of registered prostitutes was 2,000. Within this population, a study done in 1919-1920 concluded that sixty percent of these women were non-Muslim and forty percent were Muslim; however, this number did not account for the prostitutes who were working illegally. 

Throughout the years, an increasing amount of women began to resort to prostitution as a means of financial income. Many women who resorted to prostitution did so due to being single mothers, homelessness, poverty, and to afford childcare services. While only registered and unmarried women over the age of eighteen can work in state-regulated brothels, those un-registered are forced to work outside the system. Thus, non-registered women had to work in illegal brothels, as streetwalkers, and sell sexual services from their homes.

Legal status 
Prostitution in Turkey is regulated under article 227 of the Turkish Penal Code (Law No. 5237).
Promoting prostitution is punishable by two months to four years' imprisonment. The passport law forbids entry to Turkey for the purposes of prostitution.

Brothels (Genelev) are legal and licensed under health laws dealing with Sexually transmitted infections. Women need to be registered and acquire an ID card stating the dates of their health checks. It is mandatory for registered prostitutes to undergo regular health checks for sexually transmitted diseases, and the use of condoms is mandatory. The police are allowed to check the authenticity of registered prostitutes to determine whether they have been examined properly and to ensure they see the health authorities if they don't. However, men cannot register under this regulation. Most prostitutes, however, are unregistered, as local governments have made it policy not to issue new registrations.

Other regulations affecting prostitutes in Turkey include the Misdemeanor Law, Article 32.
However, the application of this law has been quite controversial.
In some cities, such as Ankara and Bursa, brothels have been demolished by court order.

Though laws were enacted to regulate prostitution and the spread of venereal diseases, these laws harm sex workers more than benefit them. Sex workers must be tested for STDs twice a week at hospitals designated for registered sex workers. While no law incriminates illegal sex workers, they can still be subjected to a medical examination if caught by law enforcement. Although laws and policies regarding prostitution in Turkey aim to benefit public health, they fail to take into account the rights of sex workers. Despite strict regulations on health checks, the men who pay for sex are not subjected to any medical examination for STDs. This is likely due to the government’s efforts to keep brothels open for “men’s sexual needs.” The tolerance of male sexuality and the lack of medical examination, punishment, or any penalty for clients who buy sex fuel the growth of the sex business in Turkey.

Sex work 
The sex trade in Turkey takes many forms, including escort prostitution, street prostitution, and prostitution conducted in brothels. More specifically, brothels (Genelevs), are state-run, with bodyguards appointed by the police. As of 2011, there were about 56 state-licensed brothels. It is estimated that the Turkish sex market includes about 100,000 Turkish sex workers (legal and illegal) and about 30,000 to 50,000 foreign sex workers. While the sex trade takes many forms, those who work as indoor prostitutes have more advantages than those who engage in street prostitution. This may be attributed to the fact that those who work outdoors are prone to be robbed, harassed, and sexually abused. While indoor prostitution poses a better option, to work indoors, women must be registered, unmarried, and over the age of eighteen. 

In addition, women once registered are unable to work outside of the sex industry unless they receive approval from the police. Although the state-run brothels were initially created to regulate the spread of venereal diseases, they now pose a threat to infringing the rights of sex workers. Once women register as sex workers, they are required to register their home address, allowing the police to raid their homes at any moment. Not only do they give up their privacy, but registered sex workers also live in a constant fear of their neighbors and family members finding out their profession, due to the stigma surrounding sex work in Turkey. 

A 2010 survey of registered sex workers revealed that 66% were single, 8% married, and 26% were previously married. And on average 25% of registered women completed primary school while only 10% completed middle school. Furthermore, a lack of childcare services and low income contributed to the reasons why many sex workers resorted to sex work. While sex workers are currently being portrayed by the media as "entrepreneurs" and "seekers of happiness," these statistics reveal how the majority of prostitutes were forced into the sex market as a result of various socio-economic factors.

Foreign sex work 
Turkey is considered a top 10 destination country for foreigners due to its lenient visa policy. And as a result of its geographical location, many citizens of neighboring countries are able to travel to Turkey. They can stay from thirty to ninety days, which in turn provides economic benefits to the country. According to the World Tourism Organization, Turkey ranked 7th in 2009 as a destination country for international tourism. However, the Turkish Passport Law “forbids individuals from entering the country solely for the purpose of prostitution” and it is illegal for unregistered workers and foreigners to perform any type of sex work.

Data from 2001 to 2009 reveal that 24,750 voluntary sex workers were deported; of these deportees, 27% were diagnosed with STDs. Many of these migrant and foreign women who are in the sex industry are considered by law to be criminal offenders. Foreign women usually leave their countries in hopes of finding domestic labor to support themselves and their families; however, as a result of the stigmatization they face when arriving in Turkey, they resort to prostitution.

Foreign and migrant sex workers have been painted in the media as the cause of the spread of venereal diseases such as HIV/AIDS. During the late 1980s and 1990s, as the HIV/AIDS crisis was at its peak, media coverage in Turkey portrayed many migrant sex workers as the reason why HIV/AIDS spread across national borders. Migrant and queer sex workers became associated with sexual objects/bodies that caused HIV/AIDS to spread to Turkey. This type of media caused a greater panic in Turkish citizens and the government, eventually leading to police raids of migrant workers' homes, mandatory STD tests, and deportation. Migrant workers to this day are both feared and hated. They are seen as individuals who came to Turkey to steal loyal Turkish husbands and employment.

Male sex work

There is an estimated 11,656 male sex workers in Istanbul, Turkey.

Transgender sex work 
Generally, most transgender individuals in Turkey who are in the sex industry experience structural violence and by law are excluded from selling sex legally. Transgender sex workers are the most vulnerable and susceptible to violence and harassment as they are forced to work outside legal institutions. Thus, they typically engage in street prostitution, and many struggle with homelessness and poverty. According to the 2011 report by the Human Resource Development Foundation, there are about 4,000 transgender sex workers in Istanbul and a total of 8,000 to 10,000 trans-women in all major cities in Turkey. According to a study done by NIH in 2021, there are about 30,447 female sex workers and 15,780 transgender sex workers in Istanbul, Turkey. The Global Network of Sex Work Projects found that between 2008 and 2012, thirty-one transgender sex workers were killed in Turkey. According to another study, between 2009 and 2015, thirty-seven transgender homicides were committed. Turkey is known to have the highest transgender homicide rates in all of Europe. However, women who are trans and sex workers, are subjected to the most physical and sexual violence from both clients and police officers.

Illegal prostitution 
Illegal prostitution is classified as operating a brothel without being licensed, being a prostitute without having health checkups, being a prostitute without having a license, or being a prostitute without being registered. Operating of illegal prostitution is punishable with a maximum of 1 year's imprisonment.

Indoor prostitution in Turkey is regulated and legal, while escort services are both illegal and unregulated. Clients can go on websites that offer sexual services because these web pages have no age requirement to use them.This enables both clients and sex workers of all ages to use the website as they please. Escorts can work independently from the convenience of their homes or any location of their choosing. This also enables male and transgender sex workers who are not legally allowed to sell sex, to use such platforms to find clients.

Strip clubs 
Strip clubs are also present in current Turkey. Strip clubs must also be licensed and strippers must be registered and have regular health checkups. All persons entering strip clubs must be at least 18 years old.

Sex workers' rights 
In 2008, activists and sex workers in Turkey announced they were working on a project to establish Turkey's first sex workers' union.

Demographics

Sex trafficking

Turkey is a top destination for victims of human trafficking in relation to the sex trade, according to a report produced by the UNDOC. 

The United States Department of State Office to Monitor and Combat Trafficking in Persons ranks Turkey as a 'Tier 2' country.

See also 
 Matild Manukyan

References

 
Society of Turkey